N9NA (pronounced Nina) is the twenty-first studio album by American rapper Tech N9ne. It was released on April 19, 2019 via Strange Music with distribution via INgrooves. Production was handled by eight record producers, including Michael "Seven" Summers, who produced ⅓ of the album. The LP features guest appearances from Krizz Kaliko, JL, King Iso, Church Boii, C-Mob, Futuristic, JellyRoll, Maez301 and Navé Monjo.

A music video for the title track was directed by Tristan Zammit and released on April 11, 2019. Music video for "Like I Ain't" was released on the same day as the album.

N9NA Collections
The full-length was preceded by two four-track extended plays: N9NA Collection 1, which was released on November 2, 2018, and N9NA Collection 2, which was released on March 8, 2019. Songs "N9NA", "Hit the Ground Running", "Chuki Fever" and "H.O.B." were included in the first EP, and the second one was composed of "I Caught Crazy! (4Ever)", "EDI's", "F.T.I. 2.0" and "Death Threats".

The song "Death Threats" is not present on the full LP, as it, along with the song, "My Own Zone," couldn't fit into the album's runtime.

Track listing

Personnel

Aaron Dontez Yates – main artist, vocals & songwriter (tracks: 2-21), A&R
Jason "JL" Varnes – featured artist, vocals & songwriter (tracks: 4, 8)
Samuel William Christopher Watson IV – featured artist, vocals (tracks: 9, 10, 12, 18, 19), additional vocals (tracks: 1, 2, 14, 17, 21), songwriter (tracks: 8-10, 12, 17-19)
Tarrel C. "King Iso" Gulledge – featured artist, vocals (tracks: 4, 6), songwriter (tracks: 4, 6, 14), producer (track 14)
Hasaan "Maez301" Keller – featured artist, vocals & songwriter (track 6), additional vocals (track 10)
Zachary Lewis Beck – featured artist, vocals & songwriter (track 8)
Evan "Navé Monjo" Hancock – featured artist, vocals & songwriter (track 16)
Christopher "C-Mob" Doehla – featured artist, vocals & songwriter (track 17)
Jason DeFord – featured artist, vocals & songwriter (track 19)
Church Boii – featured artist, additional vocals (track 21)
Nicholas Luscombe – additional vocals (track 1), songwriter & producer (tracks: 5, 6, 9-11, 17, 18)
Joshua Kelly – additional vocals (track 1)
Kaitlyn Toepperwein – additional vocals (track 1)
Alina Burch – additional vocals (track 1)
Sydney Barta – additional vocals (track 1)
Jayla Kearney – additional vocals (track 1)
Crystal Watson – additional vocals (tracks: 3, 8)
Delynia Brown – additional vocals (tracks: 3, 8)
Trey Swager – additional vocals (track 3)
Kerry Rounds – additional vocals (track 3)
Spencer Chaney – additional vocals (track 3)
Isabella Sherman – additional vocals (track 7)
Sean Tyler – additional vocals (tracks: 10, 14, 21)
Tasha Smith – additional vocals (tracks: 14, 16)
Spinstyles – scratches (track 3)
Ben Cybulsky – guitars (track 3), mixing, recording
Steven Lambert – tenor saxophone & flute (track 3)
Jason Goudeau – trombone (track 3)
Clint Ashlock – trumpet (track 3)
James Ward – tuba (track 3)
Igor Osypov – guitars (track 19)
Alexander West – songwriter, guitars & co-producer (track 19)
Dominique Sanders – songwriter & producer (tracks: 2, 7, 16, 19)
Michael "Seven" Summers – songwriter & producer (tracks: 3, 8, 12, 13, 15, 20, 21)
Anthony L. Saunders – songwriter & producer (track 4)
Frederikus van Workum – songwriter & producer (tracks: 5, 6, 9-11, 17, 18)
Hendric Bünck – songwriter & producer (tracks: 5, 9-11, 18)
Travis O'Guin – songwriter (tracks: 5, 13), executive producer, A&R
Tom Baker – mastering

Charts

References

See also
2019 in hip hop music

2019 albums
Tech N9ne albums
Strange Music albums
Albums produced by Seven (record producer)